Ben Cambriani (born 24 December 1999) is a Welsh rugby union player who plays for Ospreys regional team.

Cambriani has yet to debut for the Ospreys regional team, but has represented the Wales Sevens team at 8 events.

References

External links 
Ospreys Player Profile

Welsh rugby union players
Ospreys (rugby union) players
Living people
1999 births
Ampthill RUFC players
Rugby union wings